Edward Gulian (June 18, 1906 – November 10, 1991) was an American football, basketball, and baseball player, coach of football and basketball, and college athletics administrator.  He served as the head football coach at State Teachers College at Shippensburg—now known as Shippensburg University of Pennsylvania—from 1933 to 1946 and at Albright College from 1949 to 1954, compiling a career college football coaching record of 72–57–9.  He was also the head basketball coach at Shippensburg from 1933 to 1943 and at Albright from 1949 to 1955, tallying a career college basketball coaching record of 139–151.  Gulian attended Norristown High School in  Norristown, Pennsylvania and Gettysburg College.  He was named he athletic director at Shippensburg in 1933.  Gulian served as an assistant football coach in charge of the backfield at Lafayette College for two seasons before being hired at Albright in 1949.

Gulian served in the United States Navy as a commander during World War II.  He later taught physical education at Modesto Junior College in Modesto, California.  He remained in Modesto during his retirement, until his death on November 10, 1991.

Head coaching record

Football

References

External links
 
 

1906 births
1991 deaths
American football ends
American men's basketball players
Baseball second basemen
Basketball coaches from Pennsylvania
Albright Lions baseball coaches
Albright Lions football coaches
Albright Lions men's basketball coaches
Columbia Senators players
Gettysburg Bullets football players
Gettysburg Bullets men's basketball players
Harrisburg Senators players
Hazleton Mountaineers players
Jacksonville Tars players
Lafayette Leopards football coaches
Shippensburg Red Raiders athletic directors
Shippensburg Red Raiders football coaches
Shippensburg Red Raiders men's basketball coaches
United States Navy personnel of World War II
United States Navy officers
People from Norristown, Pennsylvania
Players of American football from Pennsylvania
Baseball players from Pennsylvania
Military personnel from Pennsylvania